Care Health Insurance Limited (formerly Religare Health Insurance Company Limited) is an Indian health insurance company established in July 2012. It is part of the Religare Group and a direct subsidiary of Religare Enterprises. Kedaara Capital is a co-promoter of the company. Care Health Insurance is headquartered in Gurgaon, Haryana, and operates out of 158 offices across India with 8500+ employees.

History
Care Health Insurance (Formerly Religare Health Insurance) has been a subsidiary of Religare Enterprise. It got its IRDAI registration on 26 April 2012 and has been among the five private sector insurers to underwrite policies exclusively in health, personal accident and travel insurance segments.

In 2021, Religare Health Insurance had a claims settlement ratio of 95.2% for the 2021 fiscal year.

Products 
Care Health Insurance currently offers products in the retail segment for Health Insurance, Top-up Coverage, Personal Accident, Maternity, International Travel Insurance and Critical Illness along with Group Health Insurance and Group Personal Accident Insurance for Corporates, Micro Insurance Products for the Rural Market and a Comprehensive Set of Wellness Services.

Awards and recognition 
Care Health Insurance was adjudged the "Best Health Insurance Company" at the ABP News-BFSI Awards 2017 and again at the Emerging Asia Insurance Awards, 2019 and "Best Claims Service Provider of the Year" at the Insurance India Summit & Awards 2018. Care Health Insurance has also received the "Editor's Choice Award for Best Product Innovation" at Finnoviti in 2017 and was conferred the "Best Medical/Health Insurance Product Award" at the FICCI Healthcare Excellence Awards in 2015, 2018 and 2019.

See also 

 Health insurance in India 
 Insurance in India

References

External links
 

Financial services companies established in 1984
Health care companies established in 1984
Health insurance companies of India
 India
Indian companies established in 1984
Insurance companies of India